Daisy Carmen Bevan (born 28 March 1992) is a British actress. She is the daughter of actress Joely Richardson and film producer Tim Bevan.

Acting
She made her screen debut in 1998 in the film Elizabeth (produced by her father's company, Working Title) at the age of five. She and her mother played daughter and mother Madame Royal and Marie Antoinette in the 2001 film, The Affair of the Necklace. In 2014, she played a supporting role in the adaptation of the Patricia Highsmith novel The Two Faces of January, and starred in a stage adaptation of Oscar Wilde's The Picture of Dorian Gray at the Riverside Studios in London.

In July 2015, Bevan played the role of Tamsin Carmichael in the BBC's two-part television adaptation of Sadie Jones’ debut novel The Outcast.

In June 2022, Bevan made a guest appearance in ITV's McDonald & Dodds - episode "A Billion Beats".

Education

Bevan attended Bedales School in Hampshire, and then the Lee Strasberg Theatre and Film Institute in Manhattan. Her parents forbade her from pursuing an acting career until she graduated.

Illness
At the age of one, Bevan was diagnosed with a rare circulatory condition that affected her legs. At 15 she had to undergo a series of operations, causing her mother to suspend her role on the TV series Nip/Tuck for a year.

Family
Bevan is a member of the Redgrave acting family, marking the fifth generation of her family to enter the profession. As the daughter of Joely Richardson, she is also the niece of Natasha Richardson and Liam Neeson and granddaughter of Vanessa Redgrave. Her parents divorced when she was nine. She has two half-siblings, Nell (b. 2001) and Jago (b. 2003), from her father's second marriage. She currently lives with her mother in London.

References

External links

English film actresses
English stage actresses
Lee Strasberg Theatre and Film Institute alumni
Living people
Place of birth missing (living people)
People educated at Bedales School
Redgrave family
1992 births
English expatriates in Japan